Carl Aejemelaeus (20 May 1882 – 13 July 1935) was a Finnish colonel, modern pentathlete and fencer.

He competed for the Russian Empire in the 1912 olympic games. After the establishment of Finland's independence he served as the First Adjutant of president K. J. Ståhlberg from 1919 to 1925 and was a military attaché in London and Moscow. Aejemelaeus is a recipient of the Cross of Liberty of Estonia.

Aejemelaeus competed for Russia at the 1912 Summer Olympics in the modern pentathlon. He was a member of Finnish Olympic Committee and a co-founder of the fencing club HFM Helsinki, which is the oldest fencing club in Finland.

References

External links
 

1882 births
1935 deaths
Finnish military personnel
Finnish male modern pentathletes
Finnish male fencers
Modern pentathletes at the 1912 Summer Olympics
People from Porvoo
Olympic competitors for the Russian Empire
Finnish expatriates in the United Kingdom
Sportspeople from Uusimaa